Mosaddek Hossain can refer to:

 Mosaddek Hossain (cricketer, born 1983), a Bangladeshi cricketer
 Mosaddek Hossain (cricketer, born 1995), a Bangladeshi international cricketer